Beach Blast was a professional wrestling pay-per-view (PPV) event promoted by World Championship Wrestling (WCW) and held in the summers of 1992 and 1993. The 1992 WCW Beach Blast PPV event was held in June on a Saturday while the 1993 WCW Beach Blast PPV event was held in July on a Sunday. It was replaced by Bash at the Beach in 1994. WCW closed in 2001 and all rights to their television and PPV shows was bought by WWE, including the Beach Blast shows. With the launch of the WWE Network in 2014 the 1992 and 1993 Beach Blast shows became available on demand for network subscribers.

Dates, venues, and main events

References